Vjatšeslav Košelev (born 20 January 1968) is a Russian-born Estonian long distance runner, hurdler and miner.

He was born in Sverdlovsk, Russia. In 1987 he graduated from Sverdlovsk polytechnical school.

He started his athletics exercising in 1999, coached by Jevgeni Terentjev. In 1987 he won silver medal at European Junior Athletics Championships in the steeplechase running. He is 5-times Estonian champion in different running disciplines.

Since 1992 he is working as a miner in a quarry called "Estonia".

References

Living people
1968 births
Estonian male steeplechase runners
Estonian male long-distance runners
Estonian male hurdlers
Russian emigrants to Estonia
Estonian people of Russian descent
People from Sverdlovsk